The Avatar: The Last Airbender – The Lost Adventures is a graphic novel anthology published by Dark Horse Comics collecting short stories from 2005 to 2011. The Lost Adventures features twenty-six in-continuity stories set throughout the run of the Avatar: The Last Airbender TV series, most of which had previously appeared in Nickelodeon Magazine or as part of DVD collections. Many of the writers and artists worked on the original animated series.

Stories
The Lost Adventures is divided into three books—Water, Earth, and Fire—corresponding to the three seasons of the TV series. On the table below, creators marked with a † worked on the Avatar: The Last Airbender TV series, and creators marked with a ‡ worked on The Legend of Korra TV series.

References

2011 graphic novels
Dark Horse Comics titles
Prequel comics
Sequel comics